Julius Christian Mergenthaler (8 November  1884 – 11 September 1980), was a Nazi German politician, member of the Reichstag and Württemberg Landtag, Ministerpräsident of Württemberg and Culture Minister.

Early life
Christian Mergenthaler was born in the Württemberg town of Waiblingen, the son of a baker. He attended grammar school there between 1894 and 1898 and then graduated from high school in Cannstatt in 1902. After studying in Stuttgart, Tübingen and Göttingen, he passed the first service exam for secondary school teachers in 1907, spent 1908-1909 as a National service volunteer, and then passed the second exam in 1911. Following that, he was employed as senior teacher in the grammar and high schools in Leonberg. During World War I he served as an artillery officer, much of that time at the front.

In 1920 Mergenthaler became a Gymnasium Professor in the town of Schwäbisch Hall. A conservative German nationalist, with an anti-Semitic character, his radicalized war experience and sense of postwar social outrage led him to extreme right politics. Mergenthaler co-founded the local chapter of the Nazi Party in Schwäbisch Hall in 1922, for which he was heavily engaged as a public speaker. After the NSDAP was banned in 1923, he joined the National Socialist Freedom Party (NSFP) instead. In 1924 he was elected to a seat for them in the Württemberg Landtag (State Parliament) and that same year he won a seat in the Reichstag.

When the ban on the Nazis expired in 1925, the NSFP was dissolved and many of its members rejoined the NSDAP. Mergenthaler hesitated to do so until 1927 because he thought Adolf Hitler's dictatorial style was harmful to the cause. In a 1928 struggle for the key position of NSDAP-Gauleiter, Mergenthaler was then outflanked by his rival Wilhelm Murr, which resulted massive tension between them. While Mergenthaler did not gain office inside the Party, he did hold the paramilitary rank of SA-Obergruppenführer in the Sturmabteilung. He always wore this uniform at public events. From 1928 to 1932, as the only representative of the NSDAP in the Landtag, he aggressively pursued the goals of the Party.

Nazi Germany
After the "landslide victory" of the Nazi party in the German National elections of 1932, Mergenthaler was elected President of the Württemberg Landtag (State Parliament). In 1933, he also became Ministerpräsident and Culture Minister. However, because Hitler appointed his rival Wilhelm Murr to the newly created position of Württemberg Reichsstatthalter (Reich Governor), the functions of State President and the Landtag lost their importance. Mergenthaler's position of Culture Minister, however, would prove to be influential.

Mergenthaler's time as Culture Minister saw the creation of a new college for primary school teachers, the building of schools for gifted elementary students in rural areas and the expansion of vocational training. These seemingly progressive reforms were accompanied by a strict enforcement of Nazism in school management. He ruthlessly pursued teachers and principals who did not follow Nazi ideology, either transferring or removing them from their jobs. Young teachers were under particularly massive pressure to join the Nazi party.

Mergenthaler also led a fierce "ideological struggle" with the church, especially the Evangelical-Lutheran Church in Württemberg and its Bishop, Theophil Wurm. For this he specifically used the school as a weapon. Mergenthaler intervened in parochial schools and banned teaching of parts of the Bible which he thought contrary to the "moral sense of the Germanic race", cut State contributions to the churches, forbade pastors who had not pledged allegiance to Hitler, and finally in 1939 ordered the introduction of a Nazi-tinged "Intuitive World Curriculum" in place of all religious education. His harsh crackdown created confusion and discord, hurting his cause more than helping it. At the local level, his actions led to bitter conflicts between the Church, the Nazi Party and the school bureaucracy which alienated the devout population of Württemberg. His most extreme measures were even curtailed by the Gauleiter and the National Nazi government.

Later life
From 1945 to 1949, Mergenthaler was interned by the Allies at Balingen, a subcamp of the former Nazi Natzweiler-Struthof concentration camp. In his 1948 Denazification trial he was convicted as a "Major Offender" and lodged no objection. After release, he secluded himself in his house in Korntal-Münchingen and was no longer seen in public. In 1951 he received a living allowance, and after being pardoned in 1953, a full teacher's pension. He died in Bad Dürrheim in 1980.

See also
 List of Minister-Presidents of Baden-Württemberg
 History of Württemberg

External links
 Christian Mergenthaler in the database of members of the Reichstag
 Denazification files of Christian Mergenthaler as digital reproduction (File 1 and  File 2) in the online archives of the Staatsarchiv Sigmaringen

References 
 Rudolf Kieß: "Christian Mergenthaler. Württembergischer Kultminister 1933-1945", in: Zeitschrift für Württembergische Landesgeschichte 54 (1995), p. 281-332.
 Rudolf Kieß: "Mergenthaler, Christian Julius, Physik- und Mathematiklehrer an höheren Schulen, MdL, MdR - NSDAP, Württembergischer Ministerpräsident und Kultminister", in: Bernd Ottnad (ed.): Baden-Württembergische Biographien, Vol. 2, Stuttgart 1999, p. 317-320.
 Rudolf Kieß: "Christian Mergenthaler (1884-1980)", in: R. Lächele, J. Thierfelder (eds.): Wir konnten uns nicht entziehen. Dreißig Porträts zu Kirche und Nationalsozialismus in Württemberg, Stuttgart 1998, p. 159-174
 Michael Stolle: "Der schwäbische Schulmeister Christian Mergenthaler, Württembergischer Ministerpräsident, Justiz- und Kulturminister," in: M. Kießener, J. Scholtyseck (eds.): Die Führer der Provinz. NS-Biographien aus Baden und Württemberg, p. 445-477.
 Michael Stolle: "Swabian Schoolmaster Christian     Mergenthaler, Württembergischer Prime Minister, Justice and Minister of Culture", in: M. Kießener, J. Scholtyseck (eds.): Führers of the Province: NS Biographies of Baden and Württemberg, pp. 445–477.
 Martin Schumacher, Katharina Lübbe, Wilhelm Heinz Schröder: Members of the Weimar Republic in the Nazi Reichstag Parliament 1933-1945. A Biographical Documentary. 3rd Edition (Düsseldorf: Droste, 1994) 
 Erich Stockhorst: 5000 heads - Who Was Who in the Third Reich (Kiel: Arndt, 2000) 
 Frank Raberg: Biographisches Handbuch der württembergischen Landtagsabgeordneten 1815–1933. (Kohlhammer: Stuttgart, 2001) , p. 562.

1884 births
1980 deaths
People from Waiblingen
Nazi Party politicians
Members of the Reichstag of the Weimar Republic
Sturmabteilung officers
German schoolteachers
German Army personnel of World War I
National Socialist Freedom Movement politicians
People from the Kingdom of Württemberg
German nationalists
Nazis convicted of war crimes
Criminals from Baden-Württemberg